Mandakini (born Yasmeen Joseph; 30 July 1963) is an Indian former actress. She is best remembered for her lead role in the 1985 popular film Ram Teri Ganga Maili.

Early life
Mandakini was born on July 30, 1963, in Meerut as Yasmeen Joseph to a British father and a Kashmiri mother. At the young age of 22, she was discovered by legendary film director Raj Kapoor and given the screen name "Mandakini".

Film career
Mandakini got her first movie in the Hindi film industry when she was cast in the lead role in the 1985 movie Ram Teri Ganga Maili by film producer-director Raj Kapoor opposite his youngest son Rajiv Kapoor. The film was a blockbuster, and it earned Mandakini a Filmfare nomination as Best Actress. She caused a stir after she was seen partially nude in two sequences of the film. She then acted in a few more successful films, such as Dance Dance with Mithun Chakraborty, Kahan Hai Kanoon with Aditya Pancholi and Pyaar Karke Dekho with Govinda, but could not recreate the success of her first movie. The actress decided to bid adieu to the Bollywood industry after her 1996 film Zordaar.

Controversy

In the early '90s, she was briefly linked to gangster Dawood Ibrahim, when she was seen with the gangster in Dubai. While she admitted to meeting him, Mandakini strongly denied the rumours of any affair with him".

Embracing Buddhism & Yoga 
In 1990, Mandakini married a former Buddhist monk, Dr. Kagyur T. Rinpoche Thakur, and embraced Buddhism. Her husband had gained fame in childhood as the baby featured in Murphy Radio advertisements in the 1970s and 1980s. The couple have a son named Rabbil and a daughter Rabze Innaya. After embracing Buddhism and becoming a follower of the Dalai Lama, Mandakini started running classes in Tibetan yoga, while her husband runs a Tibetan Herbal Centre.

Filmography

References

External links

 
 Mandakini's profile on Facebook

Actresses from Uttar Pradesh
1969 births
Living people
People from Meerut
Indian Buddhists
Buddhist activists
21st-century Buddhists
Indian film actresses
Actresses in Hindi cinema
20th-century Indian actresses
Anglo-Indian people
Indian people of English descent
Actresses of European descent in Indian films